Lasiosticha microcosma is a species of snout moth in the genus Lasiosticha. It was described by Oswald Bertram Lower in 1893 and is found in Australia.

References

Moths described in 1893
Phycitini